USS Liberty (AGTR-5) was a Belmont-class technical research ship (i.e. electronic spy ship) that was misidentified and attacked by Israel Defense Forces during the 1967 Six-Day War. She was originally built and served in World War II as a VC2-S-AP3 type Victory cargo ship named SS Simmons Victory. Her keel was laid down on 23 February 1945, under a Maritime Commission contract at Oregon Shipbuilding Corporation of Portland, Oregon.

Service history

War Shipping Administration/Maritime Commission/Maritime Administration years

The ship was delivered to the War Shipping Administration on 4 May 1945. The next day, she was transferred to the "Coastwise -Pacific Far East Line" and designated as a "Fleet Issue Ship". Her complement included a 17-man Navy Armed Guard detachment to operate the ship's gun battery; a three- or four-man communication liaison detachment; and 16 Navy enlisted people serving as "winchmen and hatchmen".

SS Simmons Victory was tasked with delivering ammunition, which was loaded at the San Francisco-area navy munitions depot at Port Chicago for Operation Downfall, the invasion of Japan. According to Harry Morgan, who served as an engineer on the ship, the Simmons Victory arrived in the Philippines about six weeks before V-E Day on 8 May 1945. She made one trip north in support of Operation Downfall and returned to the Philippines. She was in Leyte Gulf when Japan surrendered on 15 August 1945.

Simmons Victory departed Leyte Gulf on 6 October 1945, en route to the US West Coast via Eniwetok, and dumped ammunition at sea two days later. She arrived in San Francisco on 3 November 1945 and departed for the US east coast on 9 December 1945, reaching New York on Christmas Day, 1945. Her 5-inch, 3-inch, and 20-mm guns were removed there on 9 January 1946.

From December 1946 until 1963, the ship moved back and forth several times from commercial charters as a break bulk cargo carrier to stints in the National Defense Reserve Fleet (being twice berthed in the Hudson River). Most notably during this time, she made nine trips between November 1950 and December 1952 to the Far East during the Korean War "to equip American troops fighting communist North Korea" in the Military Sea Transportation Service. On 11 June 1958, Simmons Victory once again entered the National Defense Reserve Fleet, being berthed this time at Olympia, Washington, where she remained until 1963.

US Navy years

In February 1963, the U.S. Navy acquired Simmons Victory and converted her to a "Miscellaneous Auxiliary" ship at Willamette Iron and Steel of Portland. On 8 June, the vessel was renamed USS Liberty and given the hull classification symbol AG-168. On 1 April 1964, she was reclassified a Technical Research Ship (AGTR-5). She was commissioned at Puget Sound Naval Shipyard in Bremerton, Washington, in December 1964.

In February 1965, Liberty steamed from the West Coast to Norfolk, Virginia, where she was further outfitted (cost: US$20 million) to suit her for a mission of supporting the National Security Agency by collecting and processing foreign communications and other electronic emissions of possible national defense interests. In June, Liberty began her first deployment, to waters off the west coast of Africa. She carried out several more operations during the next two years, and went to the Mediterranean Sea in 1967. During the Six-Day War between Israel and several Arab nations, she was sent to collect electronic intelligence in the eastern Mediterranean.

Israeli attack

On the afternoon of 8 June 1967, while in international waters off the northern coast of the Sinai Peninsula, Liberty was attacked and damaged by aircraft of the Israeli Air Force and motor torpedo boats of the Israeli Navy; 34 American crewmen were killed and 174 wounded. Though Liberty was severely damaged, with a  hole amidships and a twisted keel, her crew kept her afloat, and she was able to leave the area under her own power.  Later, Israel apologized for the attack, stating it had mistaken Liberty for an Egyptian ship, as the incident occurred during the Six-Day War. In total, Israel gave close to $13 million (about $65 million in 2017) to the U.S. in compensation for the incident. This includes compensation to the families of those killed and wounded, and to cover damage of the ship.

The incident has become a subject of controversy and debate, with many books written on the topic.

After the attack, she was escorted to Valletta, Malta, by units of the Sixth Fleet and was given temporary repairs. After the repairs were completed, Liberty returned to the United States on 27 July 1967. She was decommissioned and stricken from the Naval Vessel Register on 28 June 1968. She was laid up in the Atlantic Reserve Fleet of Norfolk until December 1970, when she was transferred to the Maritime Administration for disposal. In 1973, she was sold for scrapping to the Boston Metals Company of Baltimore, Maryland.

Awards and decorations

As a result of the crew's heroic response to the Israeli attack, Liberty is the US Navy's "most highly decorated ship ... for a single action". For the action with Israeli forces, she was awarded the Combat Action Ribbon (8-9 June 1967) and the Presidential Unit Citation (8 June 1967). Although President Lyndon B. Johnson signed the Presidential Unit Citation in 1968, it was not formally presented to the crew until June 1991. President George H. W. Bush declined to attend the 1991 White House ceremony, instead merely waving at the crew while passing by.

Commander (later Captain) William McGonagle, Libertys commanding officer, received the Medal of Honor. Numerous members of the crew were decorated, including 11 members of the crew who were awarded Silver Stars, 20 with Bronze Stars, and over 200 who received Purple Hearts. The unidentified remains of six of Liberty'''s crew are buried under a single headstone in a mass grave in Arlington National Cemetery.Liberty was also awarded the National Defense Service Medal.

 See also 
 , the other ship in her conversion class.
 Technical research ship
 Spy ship
 USS Liberty incident
 List of Victory ships

Further reading
 

References
Explanatory notes

Sources

External links

"Casualties of the USS Liberty" on the official Arlington Memorial Cemetery web site
USS Liberty Memorial
 US Naval Sea Cadet Corps: Liberty (AGTR-5) Division, Amityville, NY
National Security Agency (NSA) declassified documents on the USS Liberty
[ USS Liberty (as Liberty (AG 168)) entry] in the official Naval Vessel Register
The Liberty's entry in NavSource Naval History's Photographic History of the US Navy''.

 

Liberty 1945
Liberty
Liberty
Liberty
Liberty
Liberty
Liberty
Maritime incidents in 1967